Lota is a village in the union council of Monan Jhelum Tehsil. The village is part of the Jhelum District of the Punjab province of Pakistan.

References 

Populated places in Jhelum District